Chronic mucocutaneous candidiasis is an immune disorder of T cells. It is characterized by chronic infections with Candida that are limited to mucosal surfaces, skin, and nails. It can also be associated with other types of infections, such as human papilloma virus. An association with chromosome 2 has been identified.

Signs and symptoms
The signs and symptoms of this condition are thickened skin, skin ulcer, dyspareunia, endocardium abnormality, vision problems, hepatitis, seizures, bloody urine, and meningitis.

Associated Diseases or Conditions 
There are a number of disorders associated with chronic mucocutaneous candidiasis including endocrine dysfunctions, vitiligo, malabsorption syndromes, neoplasms, and others. In most patients, chronic mucocutaneous candidiasis is correlated to abnormalities in cell-mediated immunity (T-lymphocyte mediated response). The T-lymphocytes fail to produce the necessary cytokines that are required for immunity against Candida. Current effective treatments include anti-fungal drugs and, for long-term remissions, restoration of cellular immunity.

Patients with autosomal-dominant mucocutaneous candidiasis may be at risk for epidermoid esophageal cancer due to the nitrosamine compounds produced by chronic candida infections.

Cause
Chronic mucocutaneous candidiasis can be inherited either autosomal dominant or autosomal recessive. There are 9 types of this condition with the first CANDF1 being located at 2p22.3-p21 (cytogenetically).

Mechanism
The mechanism the human immune system has is normally to fight an infection (like Candida). Initially, Th17 cells are made by the immune system, which in turn produces interleukin-17 (IL-17). This induces inflammation and white blood cells confront infection.

Chronic mucocutaneous candidiasis mutations affect IL-17 by inhibiting its pathway. This in turn affects the human immune system's ability to fight infection, in total there are 9 possible types of this condition.

Diagnosis
Chronic mucocutaneous candidiasis can be diagnosed in an affected individual via the following methods/tests:

Types

Treatment

Management for an individual with chronic mucocutaneous candidiasis consists of the following (relapse occurs once treatment is ceased, in many cases):

Systemic anti-fungal therapy (e.g., Fluconazole)
Transfer factor
Combination therapy
Screening (annually)

See also 
 Candidiasis
 List of cutaneous conditions

Notes
 Indicates 9 references to specific, numbered pages in the Online Mendelian Inheritance in Man database.

References

Further reading

External links 

Mycosis-related cutaneous conditions
Defects in innate immunity
IUIS-PID table 3 immunodeficiencies